Haruo Suekichi, is a Tokyo based Japanese watchmaker who creates Steampunk styled watches.

References 

Living people
Year of birth missing (living people)